Jessica van der Linden is a former college softball pitcher for the Florida State Seminoles. In 2004, she won the USA Softball Collegiate Player of the Year and Honda Sports Award for softball.

References

Florida State Seminoles softball players
Year of birth missing (living people)
Living people
Place of birth missing (living people)
21st-century American women